Mirza Mehboob Beg (born 4 September 1949) is an Indian politician from Jammu and Kashmir, belonging to the Peoples' Democratic Party (PDP) and currently serving as its Organisational General Secretary. Beg has been elected to the State Legislative Assembly, Legislative Council and the Indian Parliament. He has also served as the State's Minister for Health, Family Welfare and Medical Education .

Early life 
Mehboob Beg was born in Sarnal, Anantnag district. He is the son of Mirza Afzal Beg, a leader of the Jammu & Kashmir National Conference, who had served as a Deputy Chief Minister of Jammu and Kashmir.

Mehboob Beg studied MBBS from Srinagar Medical College and resides at Srinagar.

Career 

Beg contested his first Legislative Assembly election from Anantnag in 1983 and won it with a clear majority, becoming an MLA for the first time. In 1984 he was inducted as a Cabinet Minister for Health, Medical Education and Family Welfare. He received a letter of appreciation from UNICEF for his work as Health Minister. He is known for creating jobs in South Kashmir.

He then contested 1996 and 2002 assembly elections, and in the 2002 election received 71% of the total votes polled . He served as the  Provincial President of Jammu & Kashmir National Conference for Kashmir during 2003–2009 . He received the Best Leader award from Jammu and Kashmir Police in 2006. He got elected to the Jammu and Kashmir Legislative Council in March 2009.

In May 2009 Beg won the Parliamentary Elections from Anantnag and got elected to the Indian Parliament. His victory stunned political observers as he pulled off a victory in the parliamentary polls despite the fact that  the seat  was a PDP Bastion, with NC having only 1 MLA in South Kashmir  .   Many Political Experts believe only he could have pulled-off a victory in the Parliamentary Polls as 12 out of the 16 assembly seats in the Anantnag Parliamentary Constituency were held by the opposition, PDP, despite this Bég pulled off a famous win . It was widely reported that he was to be given Home Ministry in 2009 . He served as a member of various parliamentary committees and was the Vice President of Indo-Botswana Parliamentary Friendship.

Beg has received Bharat Gaurav Award in the field of politics. He also received Best Legislator award . He is a well known face in the Indian media. He also served as the President of the Jammu and Kashmir Handball Association.

On 16 November 2014 Bég withdrew his candidature for Jammu and Kashmir Assembly Elections from Anantnag constituency and announced his support for PDP Patron Mufti Mohammad Sayeed  . In 2021, he   became the General Secretary (Organisation) of the Party . He is the President of FAKHR-E-Kashmir Mirza Mohammad Afzal Beg Memorial Trust .

.

References

External links
 Fifteenth Lok Sabha Members Bioprofile in Lok Sahba website

India MPs 2009–2014
1949 births
Living people
Kashmiri people
People from Jammu and Kashmir
People from Srinagar
People from Anantnag district
Jammu & Kashmir National Conference politicians
Members of the Jammu and Kashmir Legislative Council
Lok Sabha members from Jammu and Kashmir
Jammu and Kashmir Peoples Democratic Party politicians
Jammu and Kashmir MLAs 1983–1986
Jammu and Kashmir MLAs 2002–2008